Cristian David Pita Bolaños (born 6 February 1995) is an Ecuadorian cyclist, who currently rides for UCI Continental team .

Major results
2012
 2nd Road race, National Junior Road Championships
2013
 5th Time trial, Pan American Junior Road Championships
2015
 5th Road race, National Road Championships
2016
 1st Stage 6 Vuelta a Guatemala
2017
 4th Road race, Pan American Under-23 Road Championships
2018
 1st Points classification, Vuelta a Venezuela
2021
 2nd  Road race, Pan American Road Championships

References

External links

1995 births
Living people
Ecuadorian male cyclists